Murphy's Pond (sometimes referred to as Murphy Pond) is a wetlands complex located in Hickman County, Kentucky.

The pond itself is owned and managed by Murray State University, located 30 miles east in Murray, Kentucky. Murray State acquired the property in 1975 with a grant from The Nature Conservancy. Access to the pond is restricted for scientific research purposes only and requires written permission from the university. Students seeking a degree in fisheries or aquatic biology at Murray State use the pond for field investigations.

Murphy's Pond is mostly swampland, with only small sections of open water. The pond and the surrounding lowlands, formed by Obion Creek and its tributaries, support one of the highest concentrations of cottonmouths in the United States. The pond is near the northernmost point of the snake's range.

References

Swamps of Kentucky
Bodies of water of Hickman County, Kentucky
Murray State University